The Missionary Society of St. Paul of Nigeria is a Catholic religious congregation based in Nigeria and serving parishes in Africa, North America, Europe, and the Caribbean. It was founded by Cardinal Dominic Ekandem in 1976.

History 
The Missionary Society of St Paul of Nigeria began as an idea in the mind of one man, its founder, Dominic Cardinal Ekandem (of blessed memory). He first conceived the idea in 1950, but took about 27 years for it to mature and see the light of day. The Catholic Bishops’ Conference of Nigeria finally made the decision to establish the National Missionary Seminary of St Paul at its meeting in Kaduna in September 1976. The timely prophetic call of Pope Paul VI in 1969, in Kampala, Uganda for Africans to be Missionaries to themselves had created the needed momentum to make the idea a reality. For the institution to take off, Most Rev Dr Anthony Sanusi of blessed memory, the then Bishop of Ijebu Ode Diocese, donated the premises of the former St Mark’s Teacher Training College at Iperu Remo, Ogun State to be used as its first home. On Mission Sunday, October 23, 1977, the seminary was opened on its temporary site in Iperu Remo. Priests of St Patrick Society of Ireland were invited to assist in the formation program of the seminary. 

In February 1978, the Catholic Bishops’ Conference unanimously erected the Missionary Society of St Paul of Nigeria into a Pious Union. This action of the Nigerian Bishops received the approval of the Congregation for the Evangelisation of Peoples in October 1978 (Prot. 4652/78). The erstwhile Vicar General of Calabar Diocese, Rev Msgr Godwin Akpan (of blessed memory), became the first Rector of the Seminary (1977-1988), and later the first Acting Superior General of the Society (1988-1995). 

On October 13, 1984, a new permanent site of the seminary campus was opened in Gwagwalada, Abuja, for the study of Philosophy and Theology, and the Iperu campus remained the two-year spiritual Formation House. The headquarters of the Society was moved to Abuja as well. The first member of the Society trained in the seminary, Fr John Osom, MSP was ordained on June 22, 1985, and eleven other members were ordained the next year. Since then, priestly ordinations have become a yearly event in the Society. 

The words of St Paul “we are ambassadors for Christ,” (2Cor 5, 20) is the motto and basis for the existence of the Society. Its members take on the missionary activities to all nations in accordance with the mandate Jesus Christ gave. Like St Paul, the members are driven by the love of Christ (Cf. 2 Cor. 5, 14) to “be all things to all people” (1 Cor. 9, 22). Though primary evangelisation is its central mission, the Society is also committed to the apostolate of new evangelisation and the printed word. The close partners of the priest members of the Society are the Associate Missionaries of St Paul. These are generous lay faithful who support the work of the Society with their time, talents, resources and prayers.

In 1986, the members of the Society were sent on foreign missions for the first time to Cameroon, Liberia and the United States of America. Since then, in addition to these countries and Nigeria, members of the Society now work in Botswana, the Gambia, Malawi, Chad, South Africa, South Sudan, Kenya, Central Africa Republic, the Bahamas, Canada, the United Kingdom, Ireland, Italy, Sweden, and Grenada. 

On March 17, 1994, the Congregation of the Propagation of the Faith gave approval for the canonical erection of the Society as a Society of Apostolic Life of Diocesan Right. The erection was officially done and approval of the Constitutions given by the Ordinary of the Society, Most Rev John Onaiyekan, on April 16, 1995. Within the same year, the first General Chapter of the Society witnessed the election of Very Rev Fr Felix Elosi, MSP as its first Superior General. The Society has held four other successful General Chapters in 2001, 2007, 2013 and 2019 and an extraordinary Chapter in 2008. These General Chapters produced Very Rev Fr Hyacinth Egbebo, MSP, Very Rev Fr Anselm Umoren, MSP, Very Rev Fr Victor Onwukeme, MSP, and Very Rev Fr Callistus Isara, MSP, as Superiors General respectively. Three members of the Society are now bishops in Nigeria: Most Rev Anthony Adaji, MSP of Idah Diocese (2007), Most Rev Hyacinth Egbebo, MSP of Bomadi Diocese (2008) and Most Rev Anselm Umoren, MSP Auxiliary Bishop of Abuja Archdiocese (2012). 

As at 2021, the Society has recorded the ordination of 320 priests, 2 deacons and 1 incardination. The Society which began as an act of faith and trust in God has continued to be touched by providence, and it has grown into a large missionary family as the first Missionary Institute of Apostolic life in Africa. It has continued to meet the needs of the Church in Africa and the universal Church. Although she is young and vibrant, she is growing from strength to strength.

Superiors general 
 Felix Elosi (1995 – 2001)
 Hyacinth Oroko Egbebo (2001 – 23 November 2007), later bishop, see below
 Anselm Umoren (2008 – 8 November 2011), later bishop, see below
 Victor Chike Onwukeme (12 September 2013 – 2019)
 Callistus Isara (2019 – )

Prelates from their ranks 
 Anthony Ademu Adaji, Bishop of Idah (Nigeria)
 Hyacinth Oroko Egbebo, Bishop of Bomadi
 Anselm Umoren, Titular Bishop of Scampa and Auxiliary Bishop of Abuja (Nigeria)

References

External links 
 

Roman Catholic missionaries in Nigeria
Societies of apostolic life